Maynard E. S. Clemons was an American attorney and politician who served as Town Counsel of Wakefield, Massachusetts and was a member of the Massachusetts House of Representatives.

Clemons was born on December 11, 1866 in Saugus, Massachusetts. He graduated from the Punchard Free School and Boston University Law School.

From 1899 to 1938 he was Town Counsel of Wakefield.

From 1923 to 1931, Clemons represented the 19th Middlesex District in the Massachusetts House of Representatives. He was defeated by Charles F. Young in 1930 by 53 votes. He defeated Young in 1932 and served one more term in the House. During his tenure in the House, Clemons was chairman of the House Committee on Legal Affairs and was one of the leaders of the legislature.

Clemons also had a law office in Boston and was a trustee of and attorney for the Charlestown Five Cents Savings Bank.  On November 18, 1946, Clemons suffered a heart attack at the Old State House subway entrance. He was pronounced dead on arrival at Boston City Hospital.

See also
 1923–1924 Massachusetts legislature
 1925–1926 Massachusetts legislature
 1927–1928 Massachusetts legislature
 1929–1930 Massachusetts legislature
 1933–1934 Massachusetts legislature

References

1866 births
1946 deaths
People from Wakefield, Massachusetts
Boston University School of Law alumni
Massachusetts lawyers
Republican Party members of the Massachusetts House of Representatives